Gavin David Young (24 April 1928 – 18 January 2001) was a journalist and travel writer.

He was born in Bude, Cornwall, England. His father, Gavin Young, was a lieutenant colonel in the Welsh Guards. Daphne, his mother, was the daughter of Sir Charles Leolin Forestier-Walker, Bt, of Monmouthshire. Young spent most of his youth in Cornwall and South Wales. He graduated from Oxford University, where he studied modern history.

Young spent two years with the Ralli Brothers shipping company in Basra in Iraq before living with the Marsh Arabs of southern Iraq between the Tigris and Euphrates rivers. He fashioned his experiences into a book, Return to the Marshes (1977). In 1960, from Tunis, he joined The Observer of London as a foreign correspondent, and was the Observer's correspondent in Paris and New York. He had covered fifteen wars and revolutions throughout the world, and worked for The Guardian and was a travel writer. Young died in London on 18 January 2001; he was 72 years old.

Selected works
Return to the Marshes: Life with the Marsh Arabs of Iraq, 1977 - travels with the Marsh Arabs of Iraq (photographs by Nik Wheeler)
Iraq: Land of Two Rivers, 1980 - travels in Mesopotamia
Slow Boats to China, 1981 - travel round the world by water transport
Halfway Around the World: An Improbable Journey, 1983
Slow Boats Home, 1985 - travel round the world by water transport
Worlds Apart, 1987 - a collection of journalistic articles
Beyond Lion Rock, 1987 - the story of Cathay Pacific Airways
"Introduction" to a new edition of Uttermost Part of the Earth by Lucas Bridges, 1987
In Search of Conrad, 1991 (Thomas Cook Travel Book Award)
From Sea to Shining Sea: Present-day Journey into America's Past, 1996
A Wavering Grace: A Vietnamese Family in War and Peace, 1997 – a Vietnamese family in war and peace
Eye on the World, 1999

See also
Wilfred Thesiger
Travel literature

References

1928 births
2001 deaths
British travel writers
People from Bude